Catalina Airport  is a privately owned airport located 6.4 miles (10.2 km) northwest of the central business district of Avalon, California, United States, in the middle of Catalina Island. The airport is open to the public and allows general aviation aircraft to land there. The only requirement is that inbound pilots state their intention to land and that they pay a $35 landing fee. The airport is primarily used for general aviation. The airport is also used for airfreight from the mainland. Supplies for the island are delivered daily.

All roads to the airport from the island's population centers climb steeply upward. The road distance from the airfield to Avalon is ten miles (16 km).

The airport currently has no scheduled passenger service.

History
Catalina Island was developed as a tourist site beginning in the 1920s by William Wrigley Jr., who owned most of the island under the Santa Catalina Island Company. In 1941 his son Philip K. Wrigley among others including Charles Hulen Moore built a runway on the island by blasting and leveling two hills and filling the canyon between them to create a leveled area. The airport opened as Buffalo Springs Airport in the spring of 1941, as a private airport. Prior to this, only seaplanes landed at Hamilton Cove Seaplane Base, just north of Avalon.

World War II
In the autumn of 1942 the United States Army Air Forces (USAAF) took control of the Buffalo Springs Airport for the duration of World War II, to support Army, Navy, Coast Guard, the Maritime Service, and the Office of Strategic Services (OSS) activities on the island. It was also a USAAF Fourth Air Force Replacement Training Station. The airfield operated during that time as a sub-base of March Field located in Riverside County.

At the conclusion of the war, the military presence departed. A California aviation veteran, Richard Probert (1907–2008), worked to have Buffalo Springs Airport opened to the public. To that end he caused a terminal building to be raised, and in 1946 the field began operating as a public use airport, called Catalina Airport.

Former passenger airline service

In the early 1950s, United Airlines served the airport with scheduled passenger service with nonstop flights to Long Beach Airport and direct, one-stop service to Los Angeles International Airport operated with Douglas DC-3 aircraft. During the mid-1950s, Catalina Air Lines was operating de Havilland Dove twin propeller aircraft on nonstop flights to Los Angeles International and Burbank Airport (now Bob Hope Airport). By the late 1950s, Pacific Air Lines was providing flights with Douglas DC-3 aircraft to Los Angeles International, Long Beach Airport, and Burbank Airport.

In the late 1960s, Catalina-Vegas Airlines was operating nonstop service to San Diego Lindbergh Field.

Golden West Airlines provided flights during the early 1970s with de Havilland Canada DHC-6 Twin Otter short takeoff and landing STOL capable twin turboprop aircraft with nonstop service to Los Angeles (LAX) and Orange County Airport (SNA, now John Wayne Airport). Golden West also acquired Catalina Air Lines, which served the island with seaplane flights operated from Avalon and Two Harbors.

In 1979, the Official Airline Guide (OAG) listed hourly shuttle service operated by Trans Catalina Airlines with small Piper Aircraft prop airplanes from both Orange County Airport (SNA) and Long Beach Airport (LGB) with eleven daily flights operated every hour on the hour from 8:00 am to 6:00 pm from both airports on the mainland to the Catalina Airport.

In 1987, Resort Commuter Airlines operating as a Trans World Express air carrier on behalf of Trans World Airlines (TWA) was flying nonstop service to Los Angeles (LAX) and the Orange County Airport (SNA).

Film shoots
Some exterior shots in the movie The In-Laws were shot at Catalina Airport, it doubling as a rural Latin airport. The tower is readily identifiable.

Repairs
After some seventy years of use, the asphalt runway was in poor condition, requiring hundreds of thousands of dollars annually in maintenance. The Aeronautics Division of Caltrans directed the Catalina Island Conservancy to create a long-term repair plan. The Conservancy worked with the Marines at Camp Pendleton, whose forces performed the repairs as a training exercise in January 2019. An encampment was erected at the airport to support the 120-person crew, and by 3 May the runway was reopened for operation. The work cost about five million dollars, paid by the airport owners. The first airplane to land on the 3,000' (914m) runway was a 1944 Douglas DC-3 that had originally been owned and operated by the Wrigley family.

Catalina Island Conservancy
The airport is now owned by the Catalina Island Conservancy, which permits air charter aircraft to fly into the airport.

Amenities
Located in the airport are publicly accessible toilet facilities and a restaurant and gift shop called DC3 Gifts and Grill.

Operation
Runway 4/22 is a tabletop runway. The runway extends nearly to the edges of the flattened area, allowing no overrun protection. The first 1800 feet of Runway 22 slopes uphill toward the southwest, with the remainder being level or slightly downhill. The result is that aircraft on short final for Runway 22 only see the first part of the runway, the remainder only becoming visible as the airplane approaches the crest. This has resulted in accidents and blown tires as pilots thought they were about to go off the end of the runway. In strong southwest winds there can be a strong downdraft at the approach end of Runway 22. As a result of these factors, many aircraft rental agencies require a "Catalina checkout" with one of their instructors. Pilot caution is recommended.

In January 1984, a private Learjet overshot Runway 22, killing six people. After that, the Catalina Island Conservancy limited the types of aircraft allowed to use the airport.

Gallery

References

External links
Buffalo Springs Station restaurant

Airports in Los Angeles County, California
Santa Catalina Island (California)
Buildings and structures in the Channel Islands of California
Airfields of the United States Army Air Forces in California
Airports established in 1941
1941 establishments in California
Privately owned airports